The Jane Froman Show was an American musical variety television series starring singer and actress Jane Froman that aired on CBS from 1952–1955.

The title USA Canteen was used from the show's premiere on October 18, 1952, until December 30, 1952. When the series became bi-weekly, the name was changed to Jane Froman's U.S.A. Canteen, which remained the title until July 2, 1953. From season two on, it became known as The Jane Froman Show.

Premise

The series starred Jane Froman, a popular singer & actress from the 1930s-1950s, who was famous on radio, TV and Broadway. During World War II she travelled overseas to entertain the United States Armed Forces. She suffered from both initial serious injuries sustained in a 1943 USO plane crash in Portugal, and from the many operations that followed to save her legs from amputation. Appearing on crutches, she was to become an image of bravery and stoicism. A 1952 movie was made about her life entitled With a Song in My Heart.

This 15-minute series was originally titled U.S.A. Canteen tying in with Froman's USO background. Then the name was changed to The Jane Froman Show. It appeared for 3 years. At the beginning of its run, it aired on alternate weeks with The Perry Como Show on NBC, but soon was scheduled bi-weekly on Tuesdays and Thursdays, then weekly on Thursdays. Vocalist John Raitt also appeared on this series.

Production 
The series was created by Irving Mansfield and produced and directed by Byron Paul. Writers were Irvin Graham, Jimmy Shirl, Ervin Drake, and Albert Stillman. The choreographer was Peter Birch, and Alfredo Antonini directed the music. The show originated at WCBS-TV.

The program was initially 30 minutes long, broadcast on Saturday afternoons. Later it changed to a 15-minute format on Tuesday and Thursday evenings.

Broadcast history

 Saturday at 9:00-9:30 pm on CBS: October 18, 1952–December 30, 1952
 Tuesday at 7:45-8:00 pm on CBS: January 1, 1953–January 28, 1954
 Thursday at 7:45-8:00 pm on CBS: January 3, 1953–June 30, 1955

References

Further reading

External links

The Jane Froman Show at the Classic Television Archive with a list of episodes

 Four episodes of The Jane Froman Show available for viewing 
 Four episodes of The Jane Froman Show available for purchasing on DVD

1952 American television series debuts
1955 American television series endings
1950s American variety television series
Black-and-white American television shows
CBS original programming
English-language television shows